Repairing Rainbows is a 2010 memoir by Lynda Fishman. The book is a true story of family, tragedy and choices.

Story
Fishman lost her mother and two sisters at the age of 13 when Air Canada Flight 621 crashed on July 5, 1970. The book describes the choices Fishman made when moving forward in her life after facing such a devastating loss.

Main characters

Lynda Fishman (nee Weinberg) 
The author, main character and voice of Repairing Rainbows. The memoir is told from Fishman's point of view, beginning with her life before the plane crash and continuing into life from the moment after Fishman and her father heard the news. Fishman was the oldest of three sisters and has always been extremely positive, energetic, inspiring and focussed on helping others.

Saul Weinberg
Fishman's father who was one day a husband and dad of three daughters, and the next a widow and father of only one. After burying his two young daughters and wife at the age of 44, Saul was overcome by sorrow and began to simply exist without any hope.

Barry Fishman
Lynda Fishman's husband, who was orphaned at the age of 17. Barry and Lynda met a few months after he was orphaned and have been together ever since. Barry has dedicated his career to working in the health care and pharmaceutical industry.

Mitchell Fishman
Lynda Fishman's special needs brother-in-law (Barry's older brother) who Barry felt very responsible for after they were orphaned.

About the author

Inspirational speaker
Fishman is now an inspirational and motivational speaker. She has extensive experience addressing audiences, both small and large groups, through media interviews and live speaking engagements. Her talk addresses the life lessons and advice that come from great experience of horrific tragedy and the journey she took to recreate her life after being faced with such significant loss. Fishman shares her three P’s: positivity, persistence and patience and discusses eight key strategies for people who want to choose life, happiness and success over feeling sad, bitter or defeated.

Camp director
Fishman has a Master of Social Work and has spent over twenty years as a day camp director. She was one of the first camp directors in Toronto to integrate children with special needs into mainstream camp. She is very passionate about the positive impact camp can have on a child's life. She is the former owner and director of Adventure Valley Day Camp.

Blogger

Fishman is a blogger for The Huffington Post. She has written several entries on various inspirational topics and life lessons she has learned over the years.

Book reviews

Kathy Kacer said: "There's survival and then there's triumph. Lynda Fishman has done the latter, both in her life, and in this sensitive and riveting account of her personal story. Her optimism in the face of overwhelming tragedies, is indeed inspiring."

Rick Hansen discusses the book as: "An amazing story of hope and inspiration" and stated that, "We all have challenges in life but it's how you deal with them that makes the difference."

Dina Pugliese explains her experience with the book as: "Compulsive reading - I couldn't put it down!"

References

2010 non-fiction books
Canadian memoirs